'88 Kix On was a various artists "hits" collection album released in Australia in 1988 on the Polystar record Label (Cat No. 816 762 1). The album spent two weeks at the top of the Australian album charts in 1988. It was released on LP with 16 tracks, and on cassette and CD with 18 tracks.

Track listing 
 "Get Outta My Dreams, Get into My Car – Billy Ocean (4:42)
 "Groove" – Eurogliders (4:02)
 "Boys (Summertime Love)" – Sabrina (3:52)
 "When Will I Be Famous?" – Bros (3:59)
 "My Arms Keep Missing You" – Rick Astley (3:13)
 "Sweet Little Mystery" – Wet Wet Wet (3:44)
 "Shake Your Love" – Debbie Gibson (3:40)
 "Sign Your Name" – Terence Trent D'Arby (4:36)
 "You're Not Alone" – Australian Olympians (5:10) (non-LP track)
 "Heaven Knows" – Robert Plant (4:05) (non-LP track)
 "Underneath the Radar" – Underworld (4:02)
 "Tell It to My Heart" – Taylor Dayne (3:41)
 "The Flame" – Cheap Trick (4:40)
 "I Want You Back" – Bananarama (3:46)
 "Love Is a Bridge" – Little River Band (4:04)
 "Could've Been" – Tiffany (3:33)
 "(Sittin' On) The Dock of the Bay" – Michael Bolton (3:53)
 "Where Do Broken Hearts Go" – Whitney Houston (4:37)

Charts

References

1988 compilation albums
Pop rock compilation albums
Rock compilation albums